The Dark Side Club is a fictional underground club in DC Comics, coming to prominence  in the Final Crisis limited series.

Fictional history
Originating from the Seven Soldiers: Mister Miracle mini-series (there was also an earlier Dark Side Club that appeared in a few issues of Justice League International, but that seems to be unrelated to the current one), the Dark Side Club serves as the stronghold for Darkseid (known as "Boss Dark Side") and the Apokoliptian New Gods stranded on Earth and a recruiting central for new loyal servants. Similar in concept to the former Roulette fight club, the Dark Side Club provides his wealthy patrons with an underground fighting ring, where brainwashed metahumans are forced to fight in often deadly battles. In a human recreation of Granny Goodness' orphanage, the captured metahumans, usually the youngest or the most obscure, are fed drugs concocted by Bernadeth and routinely abused and controlled by Granny.

Among the most known victims of the Dark Side Club there are the Tornado Twins, children of the third Flash and Misfit, young protegèe of the Birds of Prey. Since all of them manage to escape, their capture backfires on the Boss Dark Side, alerting the larger heroic community on their activities, and letting Misfit and Black Alice deal crippling blows to the organization, like killing Granny Goodness during their escape.

Dark Side then hires the Terror Titans in order to capture the Teen Titans, granting the new Clock King the role once held by Granny and Bernadeth as the chief captor and brainwasher. In such role the Terror Titans manage to capture Red Devil and Miss Martian, brainwashing the former into a feral, mindless beast, and forcing the latter into undo his mental damage.

However, not every captured metahuman is deemed fit to fight alongside the Boss Dark Side, and Doctor Bud Fogel (actually the Dark God Desaad) is sent to capture the Infinitors and deal aggressively with the Everymen kids, the younger heroes receiving often unwanted powers from Lex Luthor's exogene. Double Trouble is killed, and Vaporlock, Amazing Woman, and Empathy are captured, and forced to power a machine meant to rid the Everymen of their lingering powers, deemed too unpredictable and unstable to be used by the Dark Side Club. As a side effect, the still living Infinitors vanish.

The Club returns in the Terror Titans, where the Terror Titans are shown retaining their chief role, and granting the Dark Side Club a more business driven facade, more similar to the Roulette underground fight club. They manage to capture a cadre of new legacy, semi-obscure heroes, and Clock King hires Ravager as his minion and trainer. Rose begrudgingly accepts, still refusing to embrace the cruel ways of the Club and refusing to give up her independent will, apparently with a secret agenda of her own.

In the Final Crisis series, Dan Turpin is shown discovering that the Club has been capturing metahuman children, and teaching them to say the Anti-Life Equation.

Former Milestone Comics hero Static was revealed to be the champion of the Dark Side Club, and the strongest of its captured metahumans. During his match with Ravager, he easily defeated her and unsuccessfully attempted to attack his captors after somehow escaping the effects of the Anti-Life Equation.

Tie-ins
 Birds of Prey #118
 The Flash (vol. 2) #240
 Infinity Inc. (vol. 2) #11-12
 The Teen Titans (vol. 3) #59-60
 Terror Titans #1-6

Notes

References

External links
Dark Side Club at the DC Database Project

DC Comics organizations
Fictional clubs